Leuchars Castle, was a castle that was located near Leuchars, Fife, Scotland. 

A motte and bailey castle was built in the 12th century. The town was created a barony in the time of King William the Lion. The castle was built of stone in the 13th century. The English attacked and slighted the castle in 1327. The castle was besieged and attacked in 1337 by forces of Sir Andrew Murray and the English garrison surrendered. Rebuilt in the 16th century, the castle was demolished in the 20th century.

The nearby castle doocot is category A listed, and is on the Buildings at Risk Register for Scotland.

Citations

Ruined castles in Fife
Demolished buildings and structures in Scotland
Former castles in Scotland
12th-century establishments in Scotland
12th-century fortifications
13th-century fortifications